This is a list of 3D films released theatrically and on Blu-ray 3D from 2005 onwards.

Feature films
Note: Films listed as "Filmed in 2D" or "Rendered in 2D" in the Camera System column were converted to 3D during post-production.

2005

2006

2007

2008

2009

2010

2011

2012

2013

2014

2015

2016

2017

2018

2019

2020

2021

2022

2023

2024

Short films

Notes

References

Lists of 3D films
Lists of films by technology